Riley Township may refer to:

Riley Township, Yell County, Arkansas, in Yell County, Arkansas
Riley Township, McHenry County, Illinois
Riley Township, Vigo County, Indiana
Riley Township, Ringgold County, Iowa
Riley Township, Clinton County, Michigan
Riley Township, St. Clair County, Michigan
Riley Township, Putnam County, Ohio
Riley Township, Sandusky County, Ohio

Township name disambiguation pages